This is a bibliography of the comic book writer Robert Kirkman, the co-creator and writer of Invincible and The Walking Dead.

Early work
Titles published by Funk-O-Tron, a company established by Kirkman early in his career, include:
Battle Pope:
Battle Pope #1–4 (with Tony Moore, 2000) collected as Battle Pope: Genesis (tpb, 120 pages, 2001)
Battle Pope: Mayhem (tpb, 96 pages, 2002) collects:
 Battle Pope: Mayhem #1–2 (with Matthew Roberts, 2001)
 Battle Pope: Shorts #1 (with Tony Moore, Mark Kidwell, Brian Despain, Shane White, Matthew Roberts and Terry Stevens, 2001)
Battle Pope: Shorts #2 (with Tony Moore, Jonboy Meyers and Cory Walker; Robert Sutton is credited as a co-writer on one of the stories, 2001)
Battle Pope Presents: Saint Michael #1–3 (with Terry Stevens, 2001) collected as Battle Pope: Saint Michael (tpb, 96 pages, 2002)
Battle Pope: Shorts #3 (with Matthew Roberts, Cory Walker and E. J. Su, 2001)
Battle Pope Christmas Pope-tacular (with Tony Moore and Cory Walker, 2001)
Battle Pope: Wrath of God #1–3 (with Tony Moore, 2002)
Inkpunks Quarterly #1–3 (anthology, 2001–2002) featuring:
 "Pitchbright" (written by Walter Conley, drawn by E. J. Su)
 "Kung Foo Sally" (written and drawn by Matthew Roberts)
 "Nautilus" (written by Jason Tondro, drawn by Jonboy Meyers)
 "Chaser's Moon" (written by Kimo, drawn by Carson Grubaugh)
Double Take (anthology):
 Issue #1 (Jul 2001) featured "Codename: Mayday!" (written and drawn by Jonboy Meyers) and "Evil Waise" (written and drawn by Jason Craig)
 The following three issues adopted the numbering of the Double Image anthology, then-recently canceled by Image after its fifth issue.
 Issues #6–8 (Nov 2001–Jan 2002) featured the continuation of the "Codeflesh" serial (written by Joe Casey, drawn by Charlie Adlard)
 Issues #6–8 also featured the print debut of Matt Fraction with the "Rex Mantooth" serial (written by Fraction, drawn by Andy Kuhn)
 Issue #2 (Apr 2002) featured "Tommi Trek" (written by Brian Miller, drawn by Mike Worley) and "Tales of the Realm" (written and drawn by Matt Tyree)
 Issue #3 (Jun 2002) featured "Legend of Stone Monkey" (written by Steve Cobb, drawn by E. J. Su) and  "Vice Worlds" (written and drawn by Khary Randolph)

Image Comics
Titles published by Image include:
SuperPatriot (Highbrow):
SuperPatriot: America's Fighting Force #1–4 (with Cory Walker, 2002) collected as SuperPatriot: America's Fighting Force (tpb, 128 pages, 2011)
SuperPatriot: War on Terror #1–4 (with E. J. Su; Benito Cereno is credited for "script assist" in issue #3, 2004–2007)
Masters of the Universe (MVCreations):
Masters of the Universe: Dream Halloween: "Hope" (as letterer; written by Val Staples, drawn by Enza Fontana, one-shot, 2002)
Masters of the Universe: TDK Promotional Comic: "The Battle Begins" (as letterer; written by Val Staples, drawn by Emiliano Santalucia, 2002)
Masters of the Universe — Icons of Evil: Beastman (script by Kirkman from a plot by Kirkman, Val Staples and Ian Richter, art by Tony Moore, one-shot, 2003)
 The rest of the Icons of Evil one-shots, also scripted by Kirkman, were published after MVCreations became an imprint of CrossGen.
 Collected in Masters of the Universe: Icons of Evil (tpb, 176 pages, CrossGen, 2004)
Tech Jacket #1–6 (with E. J. Su, 2002–2003) collected as Tech Jacket: Lost and Found (tpb, 144 pages, 2003)
 Kirkman's plots for issues #7–8 were repurposed into a back-up feature in Invincible #71–75, 77–78 and 80 (written by Aubrey Sitterson, drawn by E. J. Su, 2010–2011)
 The back-up feature was collected into digital-only issues Tech Jacket #7–8 (2013) and included in Tech Jacket: Lift Off (tpb, 128 pages, 2014)
Invincible (with Cory Walker and Ryan Ottley; published under Skybound starting with issue #74, 2003–2018) collected as:
Ultimate Collection Volume 1 (collects #1–13, hc, 400 pages, 2005)
Ultimate Collection Volume 2 (collects #0, 14–24, hc, 352 pages, 2006)
 Includes the Invincible short story from the Free Comic Book Day 2004: Image Comics special (written by Kirkman, art by Ryan Ottley, 2004)
Ultimate Collection Volume 3 (collects #25–35, hc, 336 pages, 2007)
 Includes the fourth issue of the second volume of The Pact crossover limited series (written by Kirkman, art by Jason Howard, 2006)
Ultimate Collection Volume 4 (collects #36–47, hc, 336 pages, 2009)
Ultimate Collection Volume 5 (collects #48–59 and The Astounding Wolf-Man #11, hc, 336 pages, 2010)
Ultimate Collection Volume 6 (collects #60–70, hc, 336 pages, 2011)
 Includes the Invincible Returns one-shot (written by Kirkman, art by Cory Walker and Ryan Ottley, 2010)
Ultimate Collection Volume 7 (collects #71–84, hc, 384 pages, 2012)
Ultimate Collection Volume 8 (collects #85–96, hc, 336 pages, 2013)
Ultimate Collection Volume 9 (collects #97–108, hc, 336 pages, 2014)
Ultimate Collection Volume 10 (collects #109–120, hc, 336 pages, 2015)
Ultimate Collection Volume 11 (collects #121–132, hc, 304 pages, 2017)
Ultimate Collection Volume 12 (collects #133–144, hc, 344 pages, 2018)
Compendium One (collects #0–47, The Pact vol. 2 #4 and Free Comic Book Day 2004: Image Comics, tpb, 1,024 pages, 2011)
Compendium Two (collects #48–96, The Astounding Wolf-Man #11 and the Invincible Returns one-shot, tpb, 1,184 pages, 2013)
Compendium Three (collects #97–144, tpb, 1,104 pages, 2018)
Savage Dragon (Highbrow):
Savage Dragon #109–118: "Mighty Man" (as letterer; co-written by Gary Carlson and Erik Larsen, drawn by Mark Englert, co-feature, 2003–2004)
Savage Dragon: God War #1–4 (with Mark Englert, 2004–2005)
Brit: Old Soldier (tpb, 176 pages, 2007) collects:
Brit (with Tony Moore, one-shot, 2003)
Brit: Cold Death (with Tony Moore, one-shot, 2003)
Brit: Red, White, Black & Blue (with Cliff Rathburn, one-shot, 2004)
Capes #1–3 (with Mark Englert, 2003)
 Continued as a back-up feature in Invincible #27–31, 34–38 and 40–41 (written by Kirkman, drawn by Mark Englert, 2005–2007)
 The series, along with the back-up feature, is collected as Capes: Punching the Clock (tpb, 144 pages, 2007)
The Walking Dead:
The Walking Dead (with Tony Moore and Charlie Adlard; published under Skybound starting with issue #76, 2003–2019) collected as:
 Book One (collects #1–12, hc, 304 pages, 2006)
 Includes the Morgan Jones short story from Image Holiday Special 2005 (written by Kirkman, art by Charlie Adlard, 2005)
 Book Two (collects #13–24, hc, 304 pages, 2007)
 Book Three (collects #25–36, hc, 304 pages, 2007)
 Book Four (collects #37–48, hc, 304 pages, 2008)
 Book Five (collects #49–60, hc, 304 pages, 2010)
 Book Six (collects #61–72, hc, 304 pages, 2010)
 Book Seven (collects #73–84, hc, 304 pages, 2011)
 Book Eight (collects #85–96, hc, 336 pages, 2012)
 Book Nine (collects #97–108, hc, 336 pages, 2013)
 Book Ten (collects #109–120, hc, 304 pages, 2014)
 Book Eleven (collects #121–132, hc, 396 pages, 2015)
 Book Twelve (collects #133–144, hc, 396 pages, 2015)
 Book Thirteen (collects #145–156, hc, 396 pages, 2016)
 Book Fourteen (collects #157–168, hc, 396 pages, 2017)
 Book Fifteen (collects #169–180, hc, 396 pages, 2018)
 Book Sixteen (collects #181–193, hc, 396 pages, 2019)
 Compendium One (collects #1–48, tpb, 1,088 pages, 2009)
 Compendium Two (collects #49–96, tpb, 1,068 pages, 2012)
 Compendium Three (collects #97–144, tpb, 1,088 pages, 2015)
 Compendium Four (collects #145–193, tpb, 1,096 pages, 2019)
Playboy #2012–04: "Michonne's Story" (with Charlie Adlard, six-page co-feature, 2012)
Liberty Annual '12: "Governor" (with Charlie Adlard, anthology, 2012) collected in CBLDF Presents: Liberty (hc, 216 pages, 2014, ; tpb, 2016)
Free Comic Book Day 2013: The Walking Dead (new untitled short story focusing on Tyreese along with the Morgan, Michonne and Governor stories, with Charlie Adlard, 2013)
Image Plus #1–16: "Here's Negan!" (with Charlie Adlard, co-feature, 2016–2017) collected as The Walking Dead: Here's Negan (hc, 72 pages, 2017)
The Walking Dead: The Alien (written by Brian K. Vaughan, drawn by Marcos Martín, digital one-shot published at Panel Syndicate, 2016)
 Published in print under Skybound as The Walking Dead: The Alien (hc, 72 pages, 2020)
Negan Lives! (with Charlie Adlard, one-shot, 2020)
Skybound X #1–5: "Rick Grimes 2000" (with Ryan Ottley, lead feature in the anthology, 2021) collected as Rick Grimes 2000 (hc, 64 pages, 2022)
 Issue #1 of the anthology also featured a Clementine short story which served as a prologue to the series of graphic novels, all written and drawn by Tillie Walden:
 Clementine Book One (256 pages, 2022)
Crossover #12 (ten-page segment featuring Negan and Kirkman himself, with Phil Hester, 2022) collected in Crossover: The Ten-Cent Plague (tpb, 176 pages, 2022)
Cloudfall (with E. J. Su, one-shots):
Cloudfall (2003)
Cloudfall: Loose Ends (unreleased)
Reaper (with Cliff Rathburn, one-shot, 2004)
Noble Causes: Extended Family #2: "Rite of Passage" (with Cory Walker, anthology, 2004) collected in Noble Causes Archives Volume 2 (tpb, 598 pages, 2009)
Battle Pope (colorized reprints of the Funk-O-Tron series (excluding Saint Michael) along with the new pages created by Tony Moore for the original collections, 2005–2007) collected as:
Genesis (collects #1–4, tpb, 120 pages, 2006)
Mayhem (collects #5–8, tpb, 120 pages, 2006)
Pillow Talk (collects #9–11, tpb, 128 pages, 2007)
Wrath of God (collects #12–14, tpb, 128 pages, 2007)
The Golden Agers (with Scott Kurtz, unproduced 3-issue limited series — initially announced in 2005)
Four Letter Worlds: "Blam" (with Matthew Roberts, anthology graphic novel, 144 pages, 2005)
Loaded Bible (as "executive producer"; series of one-shots written by Tim Seeley from a story by Tim and Steve Seeley):
Loaded Bible: Jesus vs. Vampires (drawn by Nate Bellegarde, 2006)
Loaded Bible: Blood of Christ (drawn by Mike Norton, 2007)
The Astounding Wolf-Man (with Jason Howard, 2007–2010) collected as: 
Volume 1 (collects #1–7, tpb, 196 pages, 2008)
Volume 2 (collects #8–12 and Invincible #57, tpb, 160 pages, 2009)
 Includes the Wolf-Man short story from the Monster Pile-Up one-shot (written by Kirkman, art by Jason Howard, 2008)
Volume 3 (collects #13–18, tpb, 166 pages, 2010)
Volume 4 (collects #19–25, tpb, 160 pages, 2011)
Complete Collection (collects #1–25, Invincible #57 and Monster Pile-Up, hc, 656 pages, 2017)
Brit (as story editor; written by Bruce Brown, drawn by Cliff Rathburn and Nate Bellegarde, 2007–2009) collected as:
AWOL (collects #1–6, tpb, 160 pages, 2008)
FUBAR (collects #7–12, tpb, 160 pages, 2009)
Invincible Presents: Atom Eve and Rex Splode (tpb, 144 pages, 2010) collects:
Invincible Presents: Atom Eve #1–2 (as story editor; written by Benito Cereno, drawn by Nate Bellegarde, 2007–2008)
Invincible Presents: Atom Eve and Rex Splode #1–3 (as story editor; written by Benito Cereno, drawn by Nate Bellegarde, 2009–2010)
Haunt (co-created by Kirkman and Todd McFarlane; written by Kirkman, art by Ryan Ottley, Greg Capullo and Sheldon Vella (#17–18), 2009–2011) collected as:
Volume 1 (collects #1–5, tpb, 160 pages, 2010)
Volume 2 (collects #6–12, tpb, 160 pages, 2011)
Volume 3 (collects #13–18, tpb, 160 pages, 2012)
The Immortal Edition: Book One (collects #1–12, hc, 288 pages, 2011)
The Immortal Edition: Book Two (includes #13–18, hc, 360 pages, cancelled)
Pilot Season (series of one-shots starring characters co-created by Kirkman and Marc Silvestri, Top Cow):
Murderer (written by Kirkman, art by Nelson Blake II, 2009)
 These one-shots were continued as series under Skybound:
 Demonic (written by Kirkman, art by Joe Benitez, 2010)
 Stealth (written by Kirkman, art by Sheldon Mitchell, 2010)
 Stellar (written by Kirkman, art by Bernard Chang, 2010)
 Hardcore (written by Kirkman, art by Brian Stelfreeze, 2012)
Image United #1–3 (of 6) (with Rob Liefeld, Erik Larsen, Todd McFarlane, Marc Silvestri, Whilce Portacio, and Jim Valentino, 2009–2010)
 The series was preceded by a 4-part prologue running as a back-up feature in Savage Dragon #153, Witchblade #131, Invincible #67 and Spawn #195 (cover-dated Oct 2009)
 The prologue, written by Kirkman and drawn by Larsen, Portacio and Ryan Ottley, was reprinted as Image United #0 in an attempt to bridge the delays between the regular issues.
 Another such attempt was Image United: Interlude, to be written by Kirkman and drawn by Ottley. This one-shot, along with the last three issues of the series, was never released.
Sea Bear and Grizzly Shark: "The Origin of the Bear, and the Origin of the Shark" (short preface for the one-shot written and drawn by Jason Howard and Ryan Ottley, 2010)
Outlaw Territory Volume 2: "Man on a Horse: A Dawson Brothers Tale" (with Shaun O'Neil, anthology graphic novel, 240 pages, 2011)
Spawn:
Spawn #200: "Prologue" (script and art, 2011)
Gunslinger Spawn #1 (variant cover illustration, 2021)

Skybound
Titles published under Skybound (imprint of Image as well as a multimedia company co-founded by Kirkman in 2010) include:
Guardians of the Globe:
Guarding the Globe #1–6 (written by Benito Cereno, drawn by Ransom Getty and Kris Anka (#6), 2010–2011) collected as Guarding the Globe: Under Siege (tpb, 144 pages, 2012)
Guarding the Globe vol. 2 #1–6 (written by Phil Hester, drawn by Todd Nauck, 2012–2013) collected as Guarding the Globe: Hard to Kill (tpb, 160 pages, 2013)
Invincible Universe (written by Phil Hester, drawn by Todd Nauck, 2013–2014) collected as:
 On Deadly Ground (collects #1–6, tpb, 144 pages, 2013)
 Above the Law (collects #7–12, tpb, 144 pages, 2014)
Science Dog Special #1–2 (with Cory Walker, 2010–2011) collected as Science Dog (hc, 64 pages, 2011)
 Reprints of the Science Dog stories that ran as back-up features in Invincible #25, 50 and 75 along with a new short story.
 Two more Science Dog short stories were published in Oblivion Song #25 (2020) and Skybound X #3 (anthology, 2021)
Super Dinosaur (with Jason Howard, 2011–2014) collected as:
Volume 1 (collects #1–5 and Free Comic Book Day 2011: Super Dinosaur, tpb, 128 pages, 2011)
Volume 2 (collects #6–10, tpb, 112 pages, 2012)
Volume 3 (collects #11–17, tpb, 112 pages, 2013)
Volume 4 (collects #18–23, tpb, 128 pages, 2015)
Witch Doctor (written by Brandon Seifert, drawn by Lukas Ketner):
Witch Doctor #1–4 (2011)
Witch Doctor: The Resuscitation (2011)
Witch Doctor: Mal Practice #1–6 (2012–2013)
The Infinite #1–4 (with Rob Liefeld, 2011)
Thief of Thieves (drawn by Shawn Martinbrough, 2012–2019)
 Issues #1–7, co-written by Kirkman and Nick Spencer, are collected as Volume 1: I Quit (tpb, 152 pages, 2012)
 Issues #8–13, co-written by Kirkman and James Asmus, are collected as Volume 2: Help Me (tpb, 144 pages, 2013)
 Issues #14–19, co-written by Kirkman and Andy Diggle, are collected as Volume 3: Venice (tpb, 128 pages, 2014)
 The rest of the series, written by Diggle solo, is collected as:
 Volume 4: The Hit List (collects #20–25, tpb, 128 pages, 2014)
 Volume 5: Take Me (collects #26–31, tpb, 128 pages, 2016)
 Volume 6: Gold Rush (collects #32–37, tpb, 128 pages, 2017)
 Issues #38–43, written by Brett Lewis, are collected as Volume 7: Closure (tpb, 128 pages, 2019)
Clone #1–20 (written by David Schulner with Aaron Ginsburg and Wade McIntyre, drawn by Juan José Ryp, 2012–2014)
Ghosted #1–20 (written by Joshua Williamson, drawn by Goran Sudžuka, Davide Gianfelice and Vladimir Krstić, 2013–2015)
The Art of Charlie Adlard (features commentary from Kirkman; hc, 192 pages, 2013)
Manifest Destiny #1–48 (written by Chris Dingess, drawn by Matthew Roberts, 2013–2022)
 A short Manifest Destiny story was published in Skybound X #1 (anthology, 2021)
Dead Body Road (written by Justin Jordan):
Dead Body Road #1–6 (drawn by Matteo Scalera, 2013–2014)
Dead Body Road: Bad Blood #1–6 (drawn by Ben Tiesma, 2020)
Tech Jacket vol. 2 (written by Joe Keatinge, drawn by Khary Randolph, 2014–2015) collected as:
Lift Off (includes  #1–3 of the digital-only prelude series, tpb, 128 pages, 2014)
Touch the Sky (collects #1–6, tpb, 144 pages, 2015)
All Falls Down (collects #7–12, tpb, 144 pages, 2016)
Outcast by Kirkman and Azaceta (with Paul Azaceta, 2014–2021) collected as:
Book One (collects #1–12, hc, 296 pages, 2016)
Book Two (collects #13–24, hc, 272 pages, 2017)
Book Three (collects #25–36, hc, 272 pages, 2019)
Book Four (collects #37–48, hc, 272 pages, 2021)
Compendium (collects #1–48, tpb, 1,000 pages, 2021)
Birthright #1–50 (written by Joshua Williamson, drawn by Andrei Bressan, 2014–2021)
 A short Birthright epilogue story was published in Skybound X #2 (anthology, 2021)
Green Valley #1–9 (written by Max Landis, drawn by Giuseppe Camuncoli, 2016–2017)
Horizon #1–18 (written by Brandon Thomas, drawn by Juan Gedeon, 2016–2018)
Demonic #1–6 (written by Christopher Sebela, drawn by Niko Walter, 2016–2017) collected as Demonic (tpb, 128 pages, 2017)
 Continuation of the Pilot Season: Demonic one-shot (written by Kirkman, art by Joe Benitez, Top Cow, 2010)
Evolution #1–18 (co-written by James Asmus, Joe Keatinge, Christopher Sebela and Joshua Williamson, drawn by Joe Infurnari, 2017–2019)
Extremity #1–12 (written and drawn by Daniel Warren Johnson, 2017–2018)
Redneck #1–ongoing (written by Donny Cates, drawn by Lisandro Estherren, 2017–...)
 A short Redneck story was published in Skybound X #4 (anthology, 2021)
Kill the Minotaur #1–6 (written by Chris Pasetto and Christian Cantamessa, drawn by Lukas Ketner, 2017)
Gasolina #1–18 (written by Sean Mackiewicz, drawn by Niko Walter, 2017–2019)
 A short Gasolina story was published in Skybound X #5 (anthology, 2021)
Slots #1–6 (written and drawn by Dan Panosian, 2017–2018)
Oblivion Song (with Lorenzo De Felici, 2018–2022) collected as:
Book One (collects #1–12, hc, 280 pages, 2020)
Book Two (collects #13–24, hc, 272 pages, 2021)
Book Three (collects #25–36, hc, 272 pages, 2022)
Crude #1–6 (written by Steve Orlando, drawn by Garry Brown, 2018)
Stellar #1–6 (written by Joe Keatinge, drawn by Bret Blevins, 2018) collected as Stellar (tpb, 128 pages, 2019)
 Continuation of the Pilot Season: Stellar one-shot (written by Kirkman, art by Bernard Chang, Top Cow, 2010)
Die!Die!Die! (co-written by Kirkman and Scott M. Gimple, art by Chris Burnham, 2018–ongoing) collected as:
Volume 1 (collects #1–8, tpb, 176 pages, 2019)
Volume 2 (collects #9–14, tpb, 128 pages, 2021)
Outpost Zero #1–14 (written by Sean McKeever, drawn by Alexandre Tefenkgi, 2018–2019)
Murder Falcon #1–8 (written and drawn by Daniel Warren Johnson, 2018–2019)
 A short Murder Falcon story was published in Skybound X #3 (anthology, 2021)
Outer Darkness (written by John Layman, drawn by Afu Chan):
Outer Darkness #1–12 (2018–2019)
Outer Darkness/Chew #1–3 (additional art by Rob Guillory, 2020)
Hardcore (continuation of the Pilot Season: Hardcore one-shot written by Kirkman, drawn by Brian Stelfreeze and published by Top Cow, 2012):
Hardcore #1–5 (written by Andy Diggle, drawn by Alessandro Vitti, 2018–2019) collected as Hardcore Volume 1 (tpb, 112 pages, 2019)
Hardcore Reloaded #1–5 (written by Brandon Thomas, drawn by Francis Portela, 2019–2020) collected as Hardcore Volume 2 (tpb, 112 pages, 2020)
Assassin Nation #1–5 (written by Kyle Starks, drawn by Erica Henderson, 2019)
 A short Assassin Nation story was published in Skybound X #3 (anthology, 2021)
Excellence #1–ongoing (written by Brandon Thomas, drawn by Khary Randolph, 2019–...)
 A short Excellence story was published in Skybound X #4 (anthology, 2021)
Reaver #1–11 (written by Justin Jordan, drawn by Rebekah Isaacs and Niko Henrichon, 2019–2020)
Heart Attack #1–6 (written by Shawn Kittelsen, drawn by Eric Zawadzki, 2019–2020)
Stealth #1–6 (written by Mike Costa, drawn by Nate Bellegarde, 2020) collected as Stealth (tpb, 128 pages, 2020)
 Continuation of the Pilot Season: Stealth one-shot (written by Kirkman, art by Sheldon Mitchell, Top Cow, 2010)
Fire Power (with Chris Samnee, 2020–ongoing) collected as:
Prelude (graphic novel, 160 pages, 2020)
Home Fire (collects #1–6, tpb, 152 pages, 2021)
Stillwater #1–ongoing (written by Chip Zdarsky, drawn by Ramón K. Pérez, 2020–...)
 A short Stillwater story was published in Skybound X #2 (anthology, 2021)
 The series was supplemented by Stillwater: The Escape (one-shot, 2022) which featured stories by Jason Loo, Ethan Young and Andrew Wheeler with Soo Lee.
The Walking Dead Deluxe #1–ongoing (colorized reprints of the original series with commentary from Kirkman, 2020–...)
Solid Blood #17 (with Ryan Ottley, 2020)
Ultramega #1–ongoing (written and drawn by James Harren, 2021–...)
 A short Ultramega story was published in Skybound X #1 (anthology, 2021)
Summoners War: Legacy #1–6 (written by Justin Jordan, drawn by Luca Claretti, 2021)
Six Sidekicks of Trigger Keaton #1–6 (written by Kyle Starks, drawn by Chris Schweizer, 2021)
 A short Six Sidekicks of Trigger Keaton story was published in Skybound X #5 (anthology, 2021)
Skybound X (anthology):
 "C.O.D.E." (with Jason Howard, in #5, 2021)
 "Battle Beast" (with Ryan Ottley, in #25, 2022)
Trover Saves the Universe #1–5 (written and drawn by Tess Stone, 2021)
Lego Ninjago: Garmadon #1–5 (written and drawn by Tri Vuong, 2022)
I Hate This Place #1–ongoing (written by Kyle Starks, drawn by Artyom Topilin, 2022–...)
Skybound Presents: Afterschool (anthology, 2022):
 Issue #1 is co-written by Justin Benson with Aaron Moorhead and drawn by Greg Hinkle.
 Issue #2 is co-written by Kate Herron with Briony Redman and drawn by Leila Leiz.
 Issue #3 is written by Jill Blotevogel and drawn by Marley Zarcone.
 Issue #4 is written by Leon Hendrix III and drawn by Eric Zawadzki.
Impact Winter (written by Travis Beacham, drawn by Stephen Green, one-shot, 2022)
Creepshow (upcoming anthology series)
Everyday Hero Machine Boy (written and drawn by Irma Kniivila with Tri Vuong, graphic novel, 2022)
 A short Everyday Hero Machine Boy prelude story was published in Skybound X #2 (anthology, 2021)
Sea Serpent's Heir (written by Mairghread Scott, drawn by Pablo Tunica, graphic novel, 2022)
 A short Sea Serpent's Heir prelude story was published in Skybound X #4 (anthology, 2021)
Dark Ride #1–ongoing (written by Joshua Williamson, drawn by Andrei Bressan, 2022–...)
 A short Dark Ride prelude story was published in Skybound X #25 (anthology, 2022)
Lastman Volume 1–ongoing (written by Bastien Vivès and Balak, drawn by Vivès and Michaël Sanlaville, 2022–...)
Kroma #1–4 (written and drawn by Lorenzo De Felici, 2022–2023)
 A short Kroma prelude story was published in Skybound X #25 (anthology, 2022)
Scurry (written and drawn by Mac Smith, upcoming series)
 A short Scurry prelude story was published in Skybound X #25 (anthology, 2022)

Marvel Comics
Titles published by Marvel include:
Epic Anthology #1: "Sleepwalker: New Beginnings" (with Khary Randolph, 2004)
 Originally written for an ongoing Sleepwalker series, the completed first issue was instead printed in this anthology, which in turn was cancelled after its first issue.
X-Men Unlimited vol. 2 #2: "All the Rage" (with Takeshi Miyazawa, anthology, 2004) collected in Astonishing X-Men Companion (tpb, 168 pages, 2020)
Spider-Man Unlimited vol. 3 #4: "Love Withdrawal" (with Cory Walker, anthology, 2004)
Captain America vol. 4 #29–32: "Super Patriot" (with Scot Eaton, 2004) collected as Captain America Disassembled (tpb, 168 pages, 2004)
Marvel Knights 2099 (tpb, 120 pages, 2005) collects:
Daredevil 2099 (with Karl Moline and Mike Perkins, one-shot, 2004)
Black Panther 2099 (with Kyle Hotz, one-shot, 2004)
Inhumans 2099 (with Cliff Rathburn, one-shot, 2004)
The Punisher 2099 (with Pop Mhan, one-shot, 2004)
Mutant 2099 (with Khary Randolph, one-shot, 2004)
Jubilee #1–6 (with Derec Donovan, Marvel Age, 2004) collected as Jubilee by Robert Kirkman (tpb, 144 pages, 2011)
Marvel Team-Up vol. 3 (with Scott Kolins, Jeff Johnson (#8), Paco Medina, Cory Walker (#14 and 19), Andy Kuhn and Roger Cruz (#23), 2004–2006) collected as:
The Golden Child (collects #1–6, tpb, 144 pages, 2005)
Master of the Ring (collects #7–13, tpb, 176 pages, 2005)
League of Losers (collects #14–18, tpb, 120 pages, 2006)
Freedom Ring (collects #19–25, tpb, 168 pages, 2007)
Fantastic Four: Foes #1–6 (with Cliff Rathburn, 2005) collected as Fantastic Four: Foes (tpb, 144 pages, 2005)
The New Avengers and X-Men: America Supports You: "Time Trouble" (with Alex Chung and Scott Hepburn, one-shot, 2006)
Amazing Fantasy vol. 2 #15: "Monstro" (with Khary Randolph, anthology, 2006)
Marvel Zomnibus (hc, 1,200 pages, 2012) includes:
Marvel Zombies #1–5 (with Sean Phillips, 2006) also collected as Marvel Zombies (hc, 136 pages, 2006, ; tpb, 2007)
Marvel Zombies: Dead Days (with Sean Phillips, one-shot, 2007) also collected in Marvel Zombies: Dead Days (hc, 272 pages, 2008, ; tpb, 2009)
Marvel Zombies 2 #1–5 (with Sean Phillips, 2007–2008) also collected as Marvel Zombies 2 (hc, 128 pages, 2008, ; tpb, 2009)
What If...? (featuring Thor): "What If Thor was the Herald of Galactus?" (with Michael Avon Oeming, one-shot, 2006) collected in What If: Mirror Mirror (tpb, 152 pages, 2006)
Ultimate X-Men (with Tom Raney, Ben Oliver, Salvador Larroca, Yanick Paquette, Pascal Alixe (#82–83) and Harvey Tolibao (#93), 2006–2008) collected as:
Volume 7 (collects #66–74 and Annual #2, hc, 256 pages, 2007)
Volume 8 (collects #75–88, hc, 352 pages, 2008)
Volume 9 (includes #89–93, hc, 332 pages, 2009)
Ant-Man:
Civil War: Choosing Sides: "Conscientous Objector" (with Phil Hester, anthology one-shot, 2006) collected in Civil War: Marvel Universe (tpb, 136 pages, 2007)
The Irredeemable Ant-Man #1–12 (with Phil Hester and Cory Walker (#7–8), 2006–2007) collected as The Irredeemable Ant-Man (tpb, 272 pages, 2009)
Killraven vol. 2 (with Rob Liefeld, unreleased 5-issue limited series — initially announced for 2008; still a "work in progress" in 2009; reportedly completed in 2011)
The Destroyer #1–5 (with Cory Walker, Marvel MAX, 2009) collected as The Destroyer (hc, 120 pages, 2009, ; tpb, 2010)
X-Force vol. 3 Annual #1 (with Jason Pearson, 2010) collected in X-Force by Craig Kyle and Chris Yost Volume 1 (tpb, 384 pages, 2014)

Other publishers
Titles published by various American publishers include:
Dark Horse:
9-11 Volume 1 (untitled one-page story, with Tony Moore, anthology graphic novel, 196 pages, 2002)
Star Wars Tales #19: "The Rebel Club" (as letterer; written and drawn by Scott Kurtz, anthology, 2004) collected in Star Wars Tales Volume 5 (tpb, 248 pages, 2005)
Sky Ape: All the Heroes (two-page sequence leading in to an unreleased Battle Pope/Sky Ape crossover, with Tony Moore, graphic novel, 56 pages, AiT/Planet Lar, 2003)
MVCreations (as an imprint of CrossGen):
Masters of the Universe:
 Masters of the Universe: Icons of Evil series of one-shots, collected as Masters of the Universe: Icons of Evil (tpb, 176 pages, 2004)
 Scripted by Kirkman from plots by Kirkman, Val Staples and Ian Richter; the first release in the series,  Beastman, was published under Image:
 Masters of the Universe — Icons of Evil: Mer-Man (with E. J. Su, 2003)
 Masters of the Universe — Icons of Evil: Trapjaw (with Carlo Pagulayan, 2003)
 Masters of the Universe — Icons of Evil: Tri-Klops (with Diogenes Neves, Antony Bilal, Renato Arlem, Joseph Domingo and Miguel Montenegro, 2003)
 Masters of the Universe: Dream Halloween: "The Power of Fear" (as letterer; written by Val Staples, drawn by Emiliano Santalucia, one-shot, 2003)
Tales of the Realm #1–5 (with Matt Tyree, 2003–2004) collected as Tales of the Realm (tpb, 144 pages, 2004)
Space Ace #1–3 (with Paul Borges and Euclides Miyaura + Cid Norbert (#3), 2003)
 Kirkman completed the script for issue #4 and plotted issues #5–6 before the series' cancellation.
 In 2009, Arcana reprinted and continued the series with #4–6 drawn by Maria Cristina Francisco and #5–6 scripted by Ryan Foley.
Arcade:
Youngblood: Imperial #1– (with Marat Mychaels, 2004)
Supreme Sacrifice (with Jon Malin and Rob Liefeld, one-shot, 2006)
Magdalena/Vampirella (with Francis Manapul, one-shot, co-published by Harris and Top Cow, 2004)
Tales of Army of Darkness: "Weekend Off" (with Ryan Ottley, anthology one-shot, Dynamite, 2006)
The Most Important Comic Book on Earth: "A Glimpse" (with Charlie Adlard, anthology graphic novel, 352 pages, DK, 2021)

Novels
Kirkman has co-written a series of prose The Walking Dead novels with writer Jay Bonansinga:
The Walking Dead: Rise of the Governor (hc, 320 pages, Thomas Dunne Books, October 2011, ; sc, June 2012)
The Walking Dead: The Road to Woodbury (hc, 288 pages, Thomas Dunne Books, October 2012, ; sc, June 2013)
The Walking Dead: The Fall of the Governor – Part I (hc, 256 pages, Thomas Dunne Books, October 2013, ; sc, June 2014)
The Walking Dead: The Fall of the Governor – Part II (hc, 288 pages, Thomas Dunne Books, March 2014, ; sc, March 2015)
The Walking Dead: Rise of the Governor and the Road to Woodbury (sc, 624 pages, Thomas Dunne Books, November 2014)
The Walking Dead: The Fall of the Governor – Parts I and II (sc, 544 pages, Thomas Dunne Books, November 2014)

References

External links

Kirkman, Robert
Kirkman, Robert